Tomzanonia is a genus of orchids, (family Orchidaceae), consisting of a single species, Tomzanonia filicina endemic to the Massif de la Hotte in Haiti.

The genus is named for Dr. Tom Zanoni of the New York Botanical Garden.

References

Pleurothallidinae
Pleurothallidinae genera
Monotypic Epidendroideae genera
Orchids of Haiti